Muzhakkunnu  is a Village and Grama Panchayat in Kannur district in the Indian state of Kerala.

Demographics
As of 2011 Census, Muzhakkunnu had a population of 21,807 of which 10,532 are males and 11,275 are females. The sex ratio of Muzhakkunnu was 1,070 lower than state average of 1,084. Population of children in the age group 0-6 was 2,507 (11.5%) where 1,273 are males and 1,234 are females. Muzhakkunnu had an overall literacy of 93% lower than state average of 94%. The male literacy stands at 96.5% and female literacy was 89.7%.

Temples
Muzhakkunnu has a temple by the name Mridanga Saileswari Temple. It has a pancha loha idol inside.

Transportation
The national highway passes through Thalassery town.  Mangalore and Mumbai can be accessed on the northern side and Cochin and Thiruvananthapuram can be accessed on the southern side.  The road to the east of Iritty connects to Mysore and Bangalore.   The nearest railway station is Thalassery railway station on Mangalore-Palakkad line. There are airports at Kannur, Mangalore and Calicut.

References 

Villages near Iritty